Think: A Compelling Introduction to Philosophy is a 1999 book by the philosopher Simon Blackburn. It is intended to serve as an introduction to philosophy.

Summary 

Blackburn covers subjects such as epistemology, philosophy of the mind, free will, and philosophy of religion, discussing them on an introductory level. He also defends the value and importance of philosophy.

Publication history 
Think: A Compelling Introduction to Philosophy was first published by Oxford University Press in 1999. The book was published as an Oxford University Press Paperback in 2001.

Reception 
Think: A Compelling Introduction to Philosophy received a positive review from the philosopher Mark Sainsbury in Mind. Sainsbury described the book as well-written, but criticized Blackburn's discussion of knowledge. The writer Peter Edidin wrote in The New York Times that the book "found a sizable audience", noting that more than 30,000 hardcover copies had been sold and that "Oxford has asked Mr. Blackburn to follow up with Being Good, a guide to the philosophy of ethics". The philosopher Anthony Quinton wrote in 2005 that very short books such as Think form part of a recent new development "in the field of popularization by professionals."
Harness your natural curiosity to develop the ability to think more broadly and deeply.

References

Bibliography
Books

  256 pages.
 
 

Journals

 

Online articles

External links

1999 non-fiction books
Books by Simon Blackburn
Contemporary philosophical literature
English-language books
English non-fiction books
Oxford University Press books
Philosophy books